Viennetta is a British brand of ice cream cake made by Unilever and sold under the various Heartbrand brands around the world. The original Viennetta consists of several rippled layers of ice cream separated by thin layers of sprayed-on compound chocolate. It is currently available in vanilla and mint.

History

Viennetta was launched by British ice cream company Wall's in 1982. The layered product and patented technique for its production were devised by Kevin Hillman, development manager at Wall's Gloucester factory, Ian Butcher, and Gordon Stewart Carrick. The layers of ice cream were extruded, one after another, onto trays sitting on a moving belt. The rate of extrusion was greater than the speed of the belt which causes festooning or bunching of the ice cream; each layer was extruded at a different speed from the previous layer. The final effect was akin to a series of waves rippling through the product, giving a concertina effect to the resultant confection.

A long running UK advertising campaign for the product used the slogan "one slice is never enough", which is still occasionally used in promotion efforts.

In the 1980s and early 1990s, Viennetta was often widely considered as a luxury alternative to the lower budget choc ice ice cream snack.  Viennetta would be considered a luxury dessert, traditionally consumed after Sunday lunches by adults and children alike.

Worldwide distribution
Launched originally as a multi-portion dessert product, its success after being launched throughout KFC and Pizza Hut restaurants led to Unilever, owners of Wall's, producing many flavour and size variants. Viennetta was introduced in the United States and Canada in the late 1980s under the Breyers brand, and was discontinued in the mid-1990s, but was reintroduced in the US in 2021 under the Good Humor brand.

Unilever no longer produces the brand in Canada. It is sold in Australia and New Zealand under the Streets brand. It is sold in Italy in all supermarkets by Algida, and in Israel by Strauss, under the name Fantasia ("פנטסיה") as well as Germany, Greece and Austria. It is sold in Japan by Morinaga & Company. In Finland, Viennetta is sold under the Ingman brand. 

Viennetta was also sold in Indonesia from the mid-1990s until the mid-2000s, and re-introduced in April 2020, after a petition signed by almost 75,000 people demanded its comeback to the Indonesian market. In Thailand, it was originally available in the 1990s, and reintroduced again in November 2020. Viennetta was previously known as Comtessa in Spain, due to a legal problem, but became Viennetta in the 1990s. In 2021, Viennetta was introduced in the Philippines under the Selecta brand.

References 

Ice cream brands
Unilever brands
Products introduced in 1982